The Magic Kingdom is a theme park located at the Walt Disney World Resort in Florida.  Below is a list of the current attractions found therein, arranged by "land" and with brief descriptions.

Main Street, U.S.A.

Current attractions
 Main Street Vehicles
 Walt Disney World Railroad
 Town Square Theatre
 Harmony Barber Shop
 City Hall
 Main Street Chamber of Commerce
 Disney Enchantment (October 1, 2021–April 2, 2023)
 Happily Ever After (Returning on April 3, 2023)

Former attractions 

 Main Street Cinema (1971–1998)
 Sorcerers of the Magic Kingdom (2012–2021)
 Swan Boats (1973–1983)
 The Walt Disney Story (1973–1992)

Adventureland

Current attractions
 Jungle Cruise
 The Magic Carpets of Aladdin
 Pirates of the Caribbean
 Walt Disney's Enchanted Tiki Room (Originally Tropical Serenade 1971–1997)
 Swiss Family Treehouse

Former attractions
 The Enchanted Tiki Room (Under New Management) (1998–2011)
 Tinker Bell's Magical Nook (2011–2014)

Frontierland

Current attractions
 Big Thunder Mountain Railroad
 Country Bear Jamboree
 Frontierland Shootin' Arcade
 Tom Sawyer Island
 Walt Disney World Railroad

Future attractions
 Tiana's Bayou Adventure (Opening in late 2024)

Former attractions
 Country Bear Vacation Hoedown (1986–1992)
 Davy Crockett's Explorer Canoes (1971–1994)
 Splash Mountain (1992−2023)

Liberty Square

Current attractions
 The Hall of Presidents
 The Haunted Mansion
 Liberty Square Riverboat

Former attractions
 Diamond Horseshoe Saloon Revue (1971–1986)
 Diamond Horseshoe Jamboree (1986–1995)
 Mike Fink Keel Boats (1971–2001)

Fantasyland

Current attractions
 
 Cinderella Castle
 Dumbo the Flying Elephant
 Enchanted Tales with Belle
 It's a Small World
 Mad Tea Party
 Mickey's PhilharMagic
 Peter Pan's Flight
 Pete's Silly Sideshow
 Prince Charming Regal Carousel (Originally Cinderella's Golden Carrousel 1971 – 2010)
 Princess Fairytale Hall
 Seven Dwarfs Mine Train
 The Barnstormer featuring the Great Goofini
 The Many Adventures of Winnie the Pooh
 Under the Sea: Journey of the Little Mermaid
 Walt Disney World Railroad

Former attractions
 Mickey Mouse Revue (1971 – 1980)
 Magic Journeys (1987 – 1993)
 20,000 Leagues Under the Sea: Submarine Voyage (1971 – 1994)
 Mr. Toad's Wild Ride (1971 – 1998)
 Skyway to Tomorrowland (1971 – 1999)
 The Legend of the Lion King (1994 – 2002)
 Pooh's Playful Spot (2005 – 2010)
 Snow White's Scary Adventure (1971 – 2012)

Tomorrowland

Current attractions
 Astro Orbiter 
 Buzz Lightyear's Space Ranger Spin
 Monsters, Inc. Laugh Floor
 Space Mountain
 Tomorrowland Speedway (Originally Grand Prix Raceway 1971–1994)
 TRON Lightcycle / Run
 PeopleMover (Originally WEDway People Mover 1975–1994; Originally Tomorrowland Transit Authority PeopleMover 2010–2022)
 Walt Disney's Carousel of Progress

Former attractions
 Flight to the Moon (1971–1975)
 Circle-Vision 360°:
 America the Beautiful (1971–1984)
 American Journeys (1984–1994)
 The Timekeeper (1994–2006)
 If You Had Wings (1972–1989)
 Mission to Mars (1975–1993)
 Starjets (1974–1994)
 Delta Dreamflight (1989–1998)
 Skyway to Fantasyland (1971–1999)
 The ExtraTERRORestrial Alien Encounter (1995–2003)
 Galaxy Palace Theater (1994–2009)
 Stitch's Great Escape! (2004–2018)

Former sections

Mickey's Toontown Fair

 Donald's Boat (1996–2011)
 Mickey's Country House (1996–2011)
 Minnie's House (1996–2011)
 Toon Park (1996–2011)
 Pixie Hollow (2008–2011)

See also
 Magic Kingdom
 Magic Kingdom Parade
 List of Disney theme park attractions
 List of Epcot attractions
 List of Disney's Hollywood Studios attractions
 List of Disney's Animal Kingdom attractions

References

Magic Kingdom

Magic Kingdom